Herod Cobbina is a Ghanaian politician who served as the member of parliament for the Sefwi-Akontombra Constituency from 2005 to 2017.

Early life and education
Cobinna was born on 1 July 1956. He hails from Akontombra a town in the Western Region of Ghana. He obtained his ordinary level ('O'-Level) certificate in 1979 from Sefwi Wiawso Secondary School.

Career
Prior to entering parliament he worked as the District Storekeeper for the Cocoa Inputs Company Limited.

Politics
Cobbina served as the member of parliament representing the Sefwi-Akontombra Constituency from 6 January 2005 to 6 January 2017 under the membership and ticket of the National Democratic Congress. He lost his primaries to Kenneth Yeboah and decided to break-free from the party and contest as an independent but he lost the seat in the 2016 general election as an independent candidate. He had been in parliament for three consecutive parliamentary terms. He was a member of the Committee on Business, Defense and Interior.

Personal life
Cobbina is married with three children. He identifies as a Christian and a member of the Catholic Church.

References

Living people
1956 births
National Democratic Congress (Ghana) politicians
Ghanaian MPs 2001–2005
People from Western Region (Ghana)
Ghanaian MPs 2005–2009
Ghanaian MPs 2009–2013
Ghanaian MPs 2013–2017
Ghanaian Roman Catholics